Jacobs Pavilion (originally Nautica Stage, later Scene Pavilion, The Plain Dealer Pavilion and Nautica Pavilion) is an open-air amphitheater located on the west bank of The Flats in Cleveland, Ohio. The venue is part of the Nautica Entertainment Complex, owned by Jacobs Entertainment.

About the venue
The amphitheater opened in 1987 as Nautica Stage and was renamed Scene Pavilion in 2003, following renovations that included the addition of a canopy. The naming rights were then purchased by The Plain Dealer in 2006 and it was renamed The Plain Dealer Pavilion, a name which lasted until February 2009 when it was renamed Nautica Pavilion. Its current name was adopted in March 2011.

The venue offers bleacher and festival seating with a view of the Cuyahoga River, the lights of downtown Cleveland and the picturesque lighted bridges of the area.

The building typically holds 15 to 20 events with the concert season beginning in early summer and ending in early fall.

See also
Time Warner Cable Amphitheater
List of contemporary amphitheatres

References

External links

Nautica Entertainment Complex

Amphitheaters in Ohio
Music venues in Cleveland
Music venues completed in 1987
1987 establishments in Ohio